
Środa Śląska County is a unit of territorial administration and local government (powiat) in Lower Silesian Voivodeship, south-western Poland. It came into being on January 1, 1999, as a result of the Polish local government reforms passed in 1998. Its administrative seat and only town is Środa Śląska.

As at 2019 the total population of the county is 54,646, out of which the population of Środa Śląska accounts for 9,516, while the rural population is 45,130.

Neighbouring counties
Środa Śląska County is bordered by Wołów County to the north, Trzebnica County to the north-east, the city of Wrocław and Wrocław County to the east, Świdnica County to the south, and Jawor County and Legnica County to the west.

Administrative division
The county is subdivided into five gminas (one urban-rural and four rural). These are listed in the following table, in descending order of population.

References

External links
 Official county website

 
Land counties of Lower Silesian Voivodeship